Alexander Stølås (born 30 April 1989) is a Norwegian professional footballer who plays as a left-back for Sandnes Ulf.

Club career
Stølås was born 30 April 1989 in Haugesund. Initially he started his football career at junior level in Kopervik Idrettslag in 2004, but switched to Avaldsnes IL in 2006. He first joined FK Haugesund in 2009 but eventually failed to become a regular for the senior team, only playing 6 matches in the season FK Haugesund achieved promotion from the first division to Eliteserien. As a consequence of the lack of appearances, he joined Vard Haugesund in 2011 and gradually became locally renowned for his work-rate, technical abilities and incredible shooting power. From 2011 to 2013 he scored a total of 21 goals in 76 league appearances for the second division side, primarily from a left-back and left-wing position. He rapidly gained interest from a number of clubs in the Norwegian first division, as well as his local and former Eliteserien club FK Haugesund.

In 2014 he once again joined FK Haugesund and made his senior debut in Eliteserien on 29 March 2014 in a 1–1 draw against Lillestrøm. Having become physically stronger, it soon became apparent that he had improved immensely compared to his first period at FK Haugesund. In his first season in the Eliteserien he became one of the top scorers at the club, scoring a total of 10 goals in 33 league appearances.

His shooting abilities in particular gained nationwide attraction when he scored from over 35 metres at a set piece against top-club Molde FK on 23 May 2014. This goal was awarded Goal of the Season in Eliteserien for 2014 and also gained traction internationally.

From 2014 and onwards, Stølås rapidly became a regular at FK Haugesund and gradually one of the club's key players. On 5 November 2018, Stølås renewed his contract with FK Haugesund binding him to the club until the end of 2022. He renewed his contract despite being linked to a number of top-clubs in Eliteserien and Scandinavia, as well as the 2. Bundesliga club Union Berlin in Germany. He has also been involved in the discussion for the left-back position at the Norwegian national football team.

Personal life
Alexander Stølås' Alma mater is the Western Norway University of Applied Sciences campus Haugesund, where he holds a Bachelor of Engineering (BEng) degree in Mechanical, process and energy technology, achieved in 2017. His bachelor's thesis was titled Optimizing the cleaning process of plate heat exchangers (Norwegian: Optimalisere rengjøringsprosess av platevarmevekslere).

Career statistics

References

1989 births
Living people
People from Haugesund
Norwegian footballers
Norwegian First Division players
Norwegian Second Division players
Association football defenders
SK Vard Haugesund players
Sportspeople from Rogaland